This is a complete list of the 149 Puffin Story Books published for children from 1941 to 1960 by Penguin Books, Harmondsworth, England.

Introductory remarks
 Brief information about the content of the books is contained in the notes, where it is available. However, the content of some books is self-explanatory as in the case of biographies and books of poems by R.L. Stevenson (PS 22), Hilaire Belloc (PS 67) and  Walter de la Mare (PS 70). 
 The sequence of PS numbers does not always coincide with the sequence of dates of publication. For example, Fell Farm Holiday by Marjorie Lloyd was first published in 1951 but its PS no. is 54 so that it appears among the sequence of books published in 1949. The discrepancy between PS nos and publication dates is presumably because some books take longer than others to prepare for publication. Fell Farm Holiday was in fact commissioned in 1947 though it didn't appear till 1951.

1941–1945

1946–1949

1950–1955 
{| class="wikitable sortable"
|-
! No. !! Title !! Author !! Illustrator !! Date !! Notes
|-
|PS 57||Ditta's Tree||Jean Gordon Hughes||Mary Willett||1952||A sprite who lives in a tree in an Indian village is upset when the arrival of a red automobile makes the villagers forget to bring him the customary offerings of food and flowers
|-
|PS 58||The Hut-man's Book||G. D. Fisher||E. V. Shaw||1950||Living in a hut out in the fields alone with his dog, watching the wild life about him, exploring round about the woods and fields by night as well as by day, in winter as well as in summer – that is what makes this book different from many other story-books of natural history
|-
|PS 59||Fairy Tales from the Isle of Man||Dora Broome||John Harwood||1951||
|-
|PS 60||Tarka the Otter||Henry Williamson||C. F. Tunnicliffe A.R.A.||1949||This famous story of an otter is as true as long observation and keen insight could make it. It lets you live with Tarka and see at his level the wild life of that stretch of Devon country which runs from Dartmouth to the sea
|-
|PS 61||Worzel Gummidge Again||Barbara Euphan Todd||John Harwood|| 1949||Another book about the scarecrow
|-
|PS 62||The Adventures of Tom Sawyer||Mark Twain||A. H. Hall||1950||Tom Sawyer, a young scamp, who used to play truant and find his fun along the shores of the Mississippi. He shared it with Jim, the escaped Negro slave boy, and Huckleberry Finn, who, as son of the village drunkard, was very much of an outcast
|-
|PS 63||A Woman Among Savages||Helen Simpson||Faith Jaques||1950||this is the story of Mary Kingsley and her travels in West Africa from 1893 onwards
|-
|PS 64||Black Beauty||Anna Sewell||Charlotte Hough||1954||Classic horse tale
|-
|PS 65||Elizabeth Fry, A story biography||Kitty Barne||---||1950||
|-
|PS 66||Landfall: The Unknown||Evelyn Cheesman||---||1950||The 'landfall' is on Lord Howe Island in 1788
|-
|PS 67||Selected Cautionary Verses||Hilaire Belloc||B.T.B. and Nicholas Bentley||1950||
|-
|PS 68||The Radium Woman||Eleanor Doorly||Robert Gibbings||1953|| The Radium woman was Madame Curie, the great scientist who discovered Radium. This account of her life is inspiring and can be read simply as a magnificent story, as well as to see how a child grew to be one of the modern world's most famous scientists
|-
|PS 69||The Secret Garden||Frances Hodgson Burnett||Astrid Walford||1953||Poor Mary! She was a forlorn, unwanted, disagreeable child when, after cholera had carried off her parents, she was brought from India to live at the great lonely house on the bleak Yorkshire moors. Wandering in the gardens, she found one that was walled in. The book tells the story of how she got inside and what happened to her there. 
|-
|PS 70||Selected Stories and Verses||Walter De La Mare O.M.||R. Kennedy||1952||
|-
|PS 71||Bird Watching for Beginners||Bruce Campbell||R. A. Richardson||1952||Cover illustration by James Arnold.
This is a sound and practical guide to bird watching for beginners of any age, easy to read and very clearly expressed. There is sensible advice on the elements of the hobby, and on the first need of all – to be able to identify your bird – on useful reference books, local museums and societies. It emphasises that bird watching is the study of the living bird, and has nothing to do with the collection of stuffed birds or blown eggs
|-
|PS 72||A Puffin Book of Verse||Eleanor Graham (ed)||Claudia Freedman||?||-
|-
|PS 73||King Arthur and His Knights of the Round Table||Roger Lancelyn Green||Lotte Reiniger||1953||The King Arthur stories have been told afresh from the original sources, vividly so that the simple plot emerges plainly and is exciting to follow through all the detail of feasting and jousting and the fearful impact of knights in armour
|-
|PS 74||Five Proud Riders||Ann Stafford||Charlotte Hugh||1953||The proud riders were on New Forest ponies, and this is the story of their first riding holiday alone in the New Forest. There were five of them, boys and girls between 10 and 14
|-
|PS 75||To School in the Spanish Main||Alice Berry-Hart||Richard Kennedy||1953||School life in Central America
|-
|PS 76||Little Women||Louisa M. Alcott||Astrid Walford||1953||Classic 19th century story. The novel follows the lives of four sisters – Meg, Jo, Beth, and Amy March – and is loosely based on the author's childhood experiences with her three sisters
|-
|PS 77||The Wanderings of Mumfie||Katharine Tozer||Katharine Tozer||1955||Mumfie is a 'nelifunt', a toy that is put into Tommy's stocking by Father Christmas. On Christmas morning, Mumfie realises that Father Christmas forgot to put his best friend Scarecrow in Tommy's stocking so Mumfie decides to search for Scarecrow. The novel is the subject of an animated movie and television series by Britt Allcroft called Magic Adventures of Mumfie
|-
|PS 78||The Moor of Spain||Richard Parker||John Harwood||1953||This is a fine story of adventure, swift moving full of colour, violent action, set in the time of Christopher Columbus. The Moor is fourteen when the tale begins and eventually he sails with Columbus on the Santa Maria to the Americas 
|-
|PS 79||Melissa Ann||Ethel Parton||Sylvia Dyson||1955||A tale of Regency times
|-
|PS 80||The Adventures of Huckleberry Finn||Mark Twain||A. H. Hall||1953|| Huck was the disreputable boy in The Adventures of Tom Sawyer. He was 14 when got away from his drunken father and, running for his life, met old Jim, also on the run. Together on a raft they tumbled in and out of fantastic experiences that were part of the life of the great, busy Mississippi which the author knew so well
|-
|PS 81||Family Afloat||Aubrey de Sélincourt||Guy de Sélincourt||1954||Elizabeth, Anne, father, mother, and Uncle Bob make up the family party which set out for a sailing holiday in the 'Tessa'. No one could have foreseen all that happened on the eventful cruise or that they would have to rescue two Frenchmen out of the sea at dead of night.
|-
|PS 82||The Road to Ticonderoga or, The Long Portage||Herbert Best||Erick Berry||1954|| An 18th century tale about the strategic river portage on the  La Chute River between Lakes Champlain and George. It was the trade link between British-controlled Hudson River Valley and the French-controlled Saint Lawrence River Valley 
|-
|PS 83||The Meeting Pool||Mervyn Skipper||Sheila Hawkins||1954||There is a sparkling freshness and humour in these tales of the animals of the Borneo jungle, where no animal was permitted to kill. The animals were worried because the White Man was coming closer and closer to their haunts, chopping down the trees and burning them  
|-
|PS  84||Enjoying Paintings||A. C.  Ward||---||1954||
|-
|PS 85||Going to a Concert||Lionel Salter||---||1954||
|-
|PS 86||Going to the Ballet||Arnold Haskell||---||1954||
|-
|PS 87||Fell Farm for Christmas||Marjorie Lloyd||---||1954||Sequel to Fell Farm Holiday - PS 54 above
|-
|PS 88||Long Ears||Patricia Lynch||Sheila Hawkins||1954||The story of a little grey donkey
|-
|PS 89||Thimble Summer||Elizabeth Enright||Elizabeth Enright||1955||Garnet Linden, a nine-year-old girl who lives on a farm in Wisconsin with her two brothers. After finding a silver thimble, a drought ends, and she begins to have delightful adventures: being accidentally locked in the town library; hitchhiking to the nearest city, New Conniston; entering her prized pig into a regional fair. 
|-
|PS 90||Malay Adventure||J. S. Phillips||Stanislaus Brien||1955||A 19th-century tale of pirate war boats and of British sailors rowing up tropical rivers to smoke the pirates from their stockades
|-
|PS 91||The Children who lived in a Barn||Eleanor Graham||Mary Gernat ||1955||The Dunnet children's parents leave suddenly to see to the ailing grandmother somewhere in Europe. They tell the children that they are old enough to look after themselves - rather that Susan (aged 13) and Bob (aged 11) are quite capable of looking after twins Joseph and Samuel (aged 9) and baby of the family Alice (aged 6). Quickly evicted from their rented cottage, the children set up home in a nearby barn where the adventure rapidly becomes a saga of survival against starvation and the attentions of local busybodies
|-
|PS 92||The Puffin Quiz Book||Norman & Margaret Dixon||John Woodcock||1956||
|-
|PS 93||Boy of the Indian Frontier||Wray Hunt||Alfred Hackney||1955||The exciting story of the son of a native officer who saves the regiment from annihilation
|-
|PS 94||The Heir of Charlecote||Mark Dallow||Arthur Hall||1955||An adventure story, set in 16th century England
|}

 1956–1960 

{| class="wikitable sortable"
|-
! Number !! Title !! Author !! Illustrator !! Date !! Notes
|-
|PS 95||The White Riders||Monica Edwards||Geoffrey Whittam||1956||More adventures on the Romney Marsh. The characters try to frighten away a property developer by recreating the ghostly White Riders from the past.
|-
|PS 96||The Circus Is Coming||Noel Streatfeild||Clarke Hutton||1956||The story of a brother and sister, Peter (aged 12) and Santa (aged 11). When their aunt dies, there are plans to send them to orphanages. They don't want to be separated, so they run away to their Uncle Gus, who works for a circus. During the summer, in travelling with the circus, they mature and find their places in the circus community.
|-
|PS 97||Heidi||Johanna Spyri||Cecil Leslie||1956||Translated by Eileen Hall. This is the classic story of the little girl who goes to live with her grandfather who lives in seclusion. She charms and softens her grumpy grandpa and later helps a crippled girl to regain her health and walk again.
|-
|PS 98||The Magic Pudding||Norman Lindsay||Norman Lindsay||1957||Being the Adventures of Bunyip Bluegum and His Friends Bill Barnacle and Sam Sawnoff
|-
|PS 99||Man-Shy||Frank Dalby Davison||---||1956||The story of a red heifer (a young cow before she has had her first calf) who learned to value freedom above everything
|-
|PS 100||The Puffin Song Book||Leslie Woodgate||Heather Standring||1956||Contents include music/lyrics for Curly Locks, Baa, Baa, Black Sheep, Bells of Aberdovey, Heidenröslein, I Saw Three Ships, etc. Well over 100 pieces. Arranged mostly for voice and piano, but also for other instruments. Also includes Cockles and Mussels, Lavender's Blue, and When Johnny Comes Marching Home, as well as carols.
|-
|PS 101||Robin Hood||Roger Lancelyn Green||---||1956||
|-
|PS 102||Four Mysteries solved by Norman & Henry Bones||Anthony C. Wilson||Elizabeth Andrews||1957|| Norman and Henry Bones, the boy detectives, famous in the B.B.C.'s Children's Hour, in four stories of mystery and detection. The boys are cousins, who live the same Norfolk village. Henry is fourteen, Norman two years older. They cycle around, and know everyone within miles of their homes. They are on pleasant terms with the local police - and they always play fair!
|-
|PS 103|| Redcap Runs Away ||Rhoda Power||C. Walter Hodges||1957||It tells the story of a 10-year-old boy who takes up with a band of minstrels in 14th century before the Black Death
|-
|PS 104||Savage Gold||Roy Fuller||Robert Medley||1957||A South African tale of adventure
|-
|PS 105||The Secret of Smugglers' Wood||R J McGregor||Elizabeth Andrews||1957||
|-
|PS 106||Storm Ahead||Monica Edwards||Geoffrey Whittam||1957||Further adventure on the Romney Marsh with the characters dealing with the effects of a severe storm on their village. They must deal with floods, homelessness and other misfortunes.  
|-
|PS 107||Moon Ahead||Leslie Greener and John Hutchinson||William Pene du Bois||1957|| A thriller about a flight to the moon, a race between the genuinely scientific party and a gang of crooks who need to get there first in order to claim control for the sake of its rich mineral resources. This is a shortened version of the original edition leaving out lengthy technical discussions
|-
|PS 108||Magic in my Pocket||Alison Uttley||Judith Brook||1957||A selection of children's tales from Uttley's books
|-
|PS 109||The Haunted Reef||Frank Crisp||R. M Powers||1957||A boy's dreams of living in the South Pacific atolls are brought to life in this adventure story about boats, lost ships and treasure-seeking. 
|-
|PS 110||The Borrowers||Mary Norton||---||1957||
|-
|PS 111||King Solomon's Mines||H. Rider Haggard||---||1958||
|-
|PS 112||The Second Puffin Puzzle Book||W. E. Gladstone||Nigel Tuckley||1958||
|-
|PS 113||The Perilous Descent into a Strange Lost World||Bruce Carter||---||1958||During the Second World War, two airmen are shot down and discover the entrance to an underground world.
|-
|PS 114||The Singing Forest||H. Mortimer Batten||Maurice Wilson||1958||Story of birds and animals in the forest
|-
|PS 115||Bush Holiday||Stephen Fennimore||Ninon MacKnight||1958||The story of a boy's adventures in the Australian outback 
|-
|PS 116||The Story of the Treasure Seekers||E. Nesbit||Cecil Leslie||1958||The adventures of the Bastable children as they attempt to retrieve the family fortunes
|-
|PS 117||Going into the Past||Gordon J. Copley||---||1958||Basic early history and archaeology with chapters on different periods from the Stone Age to the post Roman period
|-
|PS 118||Going to the Opera||Lionel Salter||--- ||1958||
|-
|PS 119||Tales of the Greek Heroes||Roger Lancelyn Green||Heather Copley and Christopher Chamberlain||1958||Cover illustration by Betty Middleton-Sandford
|-
| PS 120||The Tale of Troy||Roger Lancelyn Green||Pauline Baynes||1958||
Cover illustration by Betty Middleton-Sandford. A collection of nineteen Greek myths and legends including such tales as The Story of Prometheus, The Wanderings of Heracles, The Quest for the Golden Fleece, and The First Fall of Troy
|-
|PS 121||Puffin Quartet of Poets||Eleanor Farjeon, James Reeves, E V Rieu, Ian Serraillier||1958||An anthology of poetry, selected with introductory notes by E. Graham
|-
|PS 122||The Wouldbegoods||E. Nesbit||Cecil Leslie||1958||
|-
| PS 123||My Naughty Little Sister||Dorothy Edwards||---||1959||
|-
|PS 124||Little Pete Stories||Leila Berg||Henrietta Garland||1959||
|-
|PS 125||Adventures of the Little Wooden Horse||Ursula Moray Williams||Peggy Fortnum||1959||
|-
|PS 126||Emil and the Detectives||Erich Kastner||Walter Trier||1959||
|-
|PS 127||The Cave Twins||Lucy Fitch Perkins||Lucy Fitch Perkins||1959||Story about prehistoric cave children
|-
| PS 128||Five Children and It||E. Nesbit||---||1959||
|-
|PS 129||The Phoenix and the Carpet||E. Nesbit||H. R. Millar||1959||
|-
|PS 130||The Story of the Amulet||E. Nesbit||H. R. Millar||1959||
|-
|PS 131||Avalanche!||A. Rutgers van der Loeff||Alie Evers||1959||
|-
|PS 132||The Lion, the Witch, and the Wardrobe||C. S. Lewis||Pauline Baynes||1959||
|-
|PS 133||The Good Master||Kate Seredy||Kate Seredy||1959||The Good Master is set in the Hungarian countryside before World War I and tells the story of wild young Kate, who goes to live with her Uncle's family when her father can't control her.
|-
|PS 134||Sabotage at the Forge||Richard Armstrong||L. F. Lupton||1960||
|-
|PS 135||The Story of Jesus||Eleanor Graham||Brian Wildsmith||1959|| 
|-
|PS 136||Six Great Englishmen||Aubrey de Selincourt||---||1960|| Drake, Dr. Johnson, Nelson, Marlborough, Keats, Churchill
|-
|PS137||The Namesake||C. Walter Hodges||---||1960
|-
|PS 138||The Borrowers Afield||Mary Norton||---||1960||
|-
|PS 139||The Saga of Asgard||Roger Lancelyn Green||Brian Wildsmith||1960||Also called 'Myths of the Norsemen' ? 
|-
|PS 140||Fell Farm Campers||Marjorie Lloyd||Shirley Hughes||1960||
|-
|PS 141||Eleanor Farjeon's Book: Stories, Verses, Plays||Eleanor Farjeon, James Reeves, E.V. Rieu and Ian Serraillier||Edward Ardizzone||1960||
|-
|PS 142||The Second Puffin Quiz Book||Norman and Margaret  Dixon||---||1960||
|-
| PS 143||A Hundred Million Francs||Paul Berna||---||1960||
|-
|PS 144||Snow Cloud Stallion||Gerald Raftery||Barrie Driscoll||1959|| A young boy, working on his uncle's farm in Vermont, finds wild horse that had been badly treated first. He slowly tames Snow Cloud which saves a man and becomes a hero  
|-
|PS 145||The Orphans of Simitra||Paul-Jacques Bonzon||---||1969||
|-
|PS146||The Silver Sword||Ian Serraillier||C. Walter Hodges||1960|| 
|-
|PS 147||The Railway Children||E. Nesbit||C.E. Brock||1960||Classic tale of children living by a railway. 
|-
|PS 148||Four Feet and Two: An Anthology of Verse||Leila Berg (ed.)|| Shirley Burke and Marvin Bileck||1960|| 
|-
|PS 149||Lucky Dip||Ruth Ainsworth'||Geraldine Spence||1960||A selection of stories and verses
|}

 Sources 
 Library catalogues such as the British Library, World Catalogue, National Library of Scotland, Open Library etc.
 Bookselling websites such as Amazon, abebooks, ebay 
 Phil Baines, Puffin by Design: 70 Years of Imagination 1940–2010, London: Allen Lane, 2010.
 Basic list of Puffin books till the 1960s to be found in this checklist: http://penguinchecklist.wordpress.com/puffin-books-pre-isbn Accessed 2012-06-23 Richard Williams, PUFFIN STORY BOOKS, PS 1 - PS 148, 1941–1960, British Paperback Checklist No. 33, 2010. This checklist contains valuations, publisher information, names of illustrators, and alphabetic lists of books, authors and illustrators. Available at http://www.abebooks.com/richard-sylvanus-williams-1976-north-lincolnshire/465871/sf Accessed 2014-07-15''

References 

Lists of children's books
Penguin Books book series
Lists of books by imprint or publisher
Lists of British books
20th-century British children's literature